Different methods of transportation in South Africa include roads, railways, airports, water, and pipelines for petroleum oil.  The majority of people in South Africa use informal minibus taxis as their main mode of transport.  BRT has been implemented in some South African cities in an attempt to provide more formalised and safer public transport services. These systems have been widely criticised due to their large capital and operating costs. A "freeway" is different from most countries as certain things are forbidden which include certain motorcycles, no hand signals, and motor tricycles. South Africa has many major ports including Cape Town, Durban, and Port Elizabeth that allow ships and other boats to pass through, some carrying passengers and some carrying petroleum tankers.

Department of Transport
The Department of Transport is responsible for the regulation of all transportation in South Africa, including public transport, rail transportation, civil aviation, shipping, freight, and motor vehicles. According to the department's vision statement, "Transport [is] the heartbeat of South Africa's economic growth and social development!"

Roads

Road network and freeways 

Apartheid led to the massive expansion of South Africa's road and bus systems in order to transport black workers from bantustans they had been forcibly removed from to urban areas. As a result of the severe wealth inequality under apartheid, the apartheid government heavily subsidized bus systems at the rate of $1,000 per commuter. For bantustans such as KwaNdebele, the apartheid regime provided a higher bus subsidy than their gross domestic product.

The national speed limit is 60 km/h in residential areas and 120 km/h on national roads/freeways/motorways.

In 2002 the country had 362,099  km of highways, 73,506  km (17%) of which was paved (including 239  km of expressways).

In South Africa, the term freeway differs from most other parts of the world. A freeway is a road where certain restrictions apply.
The following are forbidden from using a freeway:
 a vehicle drawn by an animal;
 a pedal cycle (such as a bicycle);
 a motor cycle having an engine with a cylinder capacity not exceeding 50 cm3 or that is propelled by electrical power;
 a motor tricycle or motor quadrucycle;
 pedestrians

Drivers in the rightmost lane of multi-carriageway freeways must move to the left if a faster vehicle approaches from behind to overtake.

Despite popular opinion that "freeway" means a road with at least two carriageways, single carriageway freeways exist, as is evidenced by the statement that "the roads include 1400 km of dual carriageway freeway, 440 km of single carriageway freeway and 5300 km of single carriage main road with unlimited access."
The Afrikaans translation of freeway is snelweg (literally fast road or expressway).

Minibus Taxis

Minibus Taxis are the predominant form of transport for people in urban areas of South Africa. This is due to their availability and affordability to the public. Most minibus taxis are not subsidized by the state and the taxi industry is notorious for using vehicles that are not well maintained are that are often not roadworthy to keep costs low. Because many taxi owners own just a few taxis and each owner may choose to manage their business differently, there is not much known as to the inner workings of the industry that is rife with violence. Since 1994 there have been efforts to formalize the industry but as taxi organisations often don't abide by labour regulations, relationships between taxi operators and the state are often strained.

In South Africa, the "Motor car" is defined as a motor vehicle, other than a motorcycle or a motor tricycle, designed or adapted solely or principally for the conveyance of persons not exceeding sixteen (16) in number, but excluding any vehicle with an axle with more than two (2) wheels irrespective of tyre size. This makes the south-African motor-car definition quite close from the ISO definition of a minibus (17 seats driver included).

In 2021, there are 349 671 registered minibuses.
In 2021, there are 73 953 unroadworthy, unlicensed or both minibuses, including 48450 unroadworthy and 20163 unlicensed one.

Cape Town and MyCiTi IRT

The City of Cape Town has made it clear that developing public transportation must be a priority, if it is to achieve its long-term developmental goals. As such, the city has planned out the development of an Integrated Rapid Transit (IRT) system called "MyCiTi IRT". In 2007, the construction of this system began with the implementation of Cape Town's "Bus Rapid Transit" system. This first phase has been designed to enable easy integration of other forms of public transport – ranging from cycling to South Africa's famous minibuses in later phases of the IRT development – including rail transit, seen currently as "the backbone of public transportation in Cape Town."

Road transport safety 

South Africa's road traffic system might be less effective than most industrial countries but is not worst that other African nations. South Africa has an institutional framework for road safety led by the Road Traffic Management Corporation. South African laws follow global best practice, including speed limits, drink-driving, motorcycle helmets, seat-belts, child restraints and mobile phone use.

South Africa counts 26 deaths each year for 100,000 people (260 per million) a higher rate than the global average of 18 per 100,000 (180 per millions).

In 2021, the country recorded 12 541 road fatalities, for 11 726 476 vehicles (7.6 million motor vehicles and over 2.6 million light delivery vehicles/bakkies). With "Motor vehicle" means powered units including motorcycle, motor tricycle, motor car, vehicle which has pedals and a mechanically/electrically powered unit or light delivery vehicle known as bakkie.

People killed in road accidents are mostly pedestrians: 37.6%; passengers: 32% and drivers: 27%.

58% of road deaths are attributed to alcohol use, which makes alcohol a leading factor in such fatalities. 
South Africa had the highest number of drunk driving incidents among WHO survey (see Driving under the influence)

Pedestrian (37% of deaths) may be affected by a 60 km/hr posted speed limit in residential and urban areas, a speed so excessive that it reduces pedestrians chance of survival to make such a chance very minimal.

Also, in South Africa rate for front seat seatbelt-wearing is 31% (lower than Norway's 95%), and between 45 and 60% for drivers.

Vehicle maintenance issues causes 9% of road accident, including tyres, brakes and lights issues.
When vehicle safety is involved, tire is the first issue in 41% of vehicle factors.

When a crash is considered major, crash type is often head-on (44%), multi vehicles (16%) and T-Bone (15%).

Railways

In 2000, South Africa had 20,384 km of rail transport, all of it narrow gauge. 20,070 km was  gauge (9,090 km of that electrified), with the remaining 314 km  gauge. The operation of the country's rail systems is accomplished by Transnet subsidiaries Transnet Freight Rail, Shosholoza Meyl, Metrorail, Transnet Engineering, Protekon et al.

On 2010-06-07 the Gautrain opened between Oliver R Tambo International Airport (ORTIA) and Sandton. This is the first stage of a standard gauge passenger line connecting Johannesburg, Pretoria and ORTIA.

Links exist to Botswana, Lesotho, Namibia, Eswatini, and Zimbabwe. Railways linking Mozambique are under repair.

Transportation systems in nearby countries

 Angola
 Tanzania same gauge as far as Dar es Salaam – transshipment to  gauge at Kidatu
 Malawi 
 Congo
 Botswana
 Lesotho
 Mozambique, under repair
 Namibia
 Eswatini
  Zambia 
 Zimbabwe

Airports

Runways in South Africa

International Airports and Airlines 
South Africa has international airports in four cities: Johannesburg, Cape Town, Durban and Nelspruit. The main international airports are in Johannesburg, and to a lesser extent Cape Town. Nelspruit's international airport mainly serves travellers en route to the Kruger National park.

There are many international airlines travelling to South Africa, giving travellers a healthy number of options. These include British Airways, Delta Airlines, Ethiopian Airways, Kenya Airways, Qantas, Singapore Airlines, South African Airways, Swiss International Air Lines, Thai Airways, Turkish Airlines, Virgin Atlantic, Air Mauritius, Air Botswana, Air France, KLM, Lufthansa, Alitalia, Malaysia Airlines and Qatar Airways.

Water

South Africa's major ports and harbours are Cape Town, Durban, East London, Mossel Bay, Port Elizabeth, Richards Bay, George and Saldanha Bay. In 2006 the new port is to open: Ngqura, at Coega, which is 20 km northeast of Port Elizabeth. The administration and operation of the country's port facilities are done by two subsidiaries of Transnet, the Transnet National Ports Authority and South African Port Operations (SAPO).

As of March 2018, the merchant marine consisted of 15 ships totalling 431,133 GT.

Pipelines
There are 931 km of crude oil pipeline transport, 1,748 km for other petroleum products, and 322 km for natural gas. Petronet, a subsidiary of Transnet, which in turn is majority-owned by the government, is principally responsible for the operation of South Africa's pipelines.

Tramways

A number of urban tramway systems operated in South Africa but no longer do so. The last system (in Johannesburg) began in 1890 as Rand Tramway (electrified in 1906) and ceased operations in 1961.

References

External links
Aviation, Airlines, Airports in South Africa
Department of Transport
Road statistics 2001/2003: distance travelled and fatal crashes by vehicle type and province (PDF)
Transnet Site
Travel Distances